Vacant possession is a property law concept.

Giving 'vacant possession' refers to a legal obligation to ensure that a property is in a state fit to be occupied at a given point in time. Vacant possession is most commonly known of on the sale and purchase of residential property and many find that, on the purchase of a new home, they do not obtain vacant possession as desired. The concept is also an essential element in the grant and termination of leases and other tenancy agreements. It is a topical issue for lawyers and surveyors along with estate agents and others connected to land and buildings.

Notes 
 Shaw, Keith (Dr.) Vacant Possession: Law and Practice. Elsevier, Oxford, 2010

External links 
 Vacant Possession: Law and Practice
 What is Vacant Possession?

Legal terminology
Property law